Yavuz Karamollaoğlu (born November 29, 1980 in Istanbul, Turkey) is a Turkish karateka competing currently in the kumite -84 kg division. He is a member of the Kocaeli B.B. Kağıtspor.

He began with karate practitioning in 1987. In 1997, he was admitted to the national team. Karamollaoğlu studied physical education and sports at Trakya University. He is teaching physical education in a primary school at Bahçelievler, Istanbul.

He won the bronze medal in the -84 kg division at the 2013 Islamic Solidarity Games held in Palembang, Indonesia.

Achievements

References

1980 births
Sportspeople from Istanbul
Living people
Turkish male karateka
Trakya University alumni
Kocaeli Büyükşehir Belediyesi Kağıt Spor athletes
Turkish schoolteachers
Competitors at the 2005 World Games
Islamic Solidarity Games medalists in karate
Islamic Solidarity Games competitors for Turkey
21st-century Turkish people